Basheer Nafi (Arabic: بشير نافع) is a Palestinian-born historian living in the United Kingdom.

Career
Nafi holds PhDs from King's College, University of London (1987) and the University of Reading (1996). He taught Islamic history and Islamic studies at Birkbeck College of the University of London, the Muslim College, and Markefield Institute of High Education.

Books
 Arabism, Islamism and the Palestine Question, 1908-1941: A Political History, Ithaca Press, Reading, 1998. 
 Imperialism, Zionism and Palestinian Nationalism (in Arabic), Cairo, Dar al-Shuruq, 1999.
 The Rise and Decline of the Arab-Islamic Reform Movement, London, ICIT Papers, 2000.
 Islamic Thought in the Twentieth Century (co-editor; in association with S. Taji-Farouki), London, I. B. Tauris, 2004.
 The Palestinian strategic Report: 2005 (co-editor; in association with Muhsin Salih; in English and Arabic), Beirut, al-Zaytouna Centre for Studies, 2006.
Iraq: Contexts of Unity and Disintegration. A Reading in Sunnism, Shi‘ism, and the Arab Identity (in Arabic), Cairo, Dar al-Shuruq, 2006.
The Islamists (in Arabic), Beirut, al-Dar al-‘Arabiyya, 2010.

References

1952 births
20th-century Palestinian historians
20th-century British historians
Living people
21st-century British historians